The Western Amazon Ecological Corridor is a proposed ecological corridor connecting conservation units and indigenous territories in the southwest of the Amazon rainforest of Brazil.

Background

The first version of the Ecological Corridors of Tropical Forests of Brazil proposal was developed by a group of consultants at the request of the Brazilian Ministry of the Environment and presented in the first half of 1997.
Seven major corridors were proposed: the Central Amazon Ecological Corridor, Northern Amazon Ecological Corridor, South Amazon Ecological Corridor, South Amazon Ecotones Ecological Corridor, Western Amazon Ecological Corridor, Central Atlantic Forest Ecological Corridor and Serra do Mar Ecological Corridor.
These corresponded to about 25% of the rainforests of Brazil.
Priority was given to the Central Amazon Corridor and the Central Atlantic Forest Corridor, which would test and develop the concepts for use with the subsequent corridors.

Proposed scope

The Western Amazon Ecological Corridor was one of five Amazon region corridors identified.
It included six priority areas in four main Amazon ecoregions, and was identified as relatively stable, globally relevant and of the highest priority on a regional scale..
It also covered more than half of the state of Rondônia, and a small part of the state of Amazonas.

Conservation units in the proposal included the Serra do Divisor National Park, Alto Tarauacá Extractive Reserve, Alto Juruá Extractive Reserve, Macauã National Forest, Chico Mendes Extractive Reserve, Jaci Paraná Extractive Reserve, Bom Futuro National Forest, Pacaás Novos National Park, Guaporé Biological Reserve and Corumbiara State Park.
As of 2010 the proposed corridor would contain 30 indigenous territories and 19 conservation units in Acre along the border with Peru, covering 45.66% of the state of Acre.

Notes

Sources

Ecological corridors of Brazil